Enclave is a third-person 3D action role-playing game developed by Starbreeze Studios, released for the Xbox on July 2002. A Microsoft Windows port was released in March 2003. A GameCube version was also in development but was eventually cancelled in early 2003. A Wii port, titled Enclave: Shadows of Twilight, was originally slated for the middle of June 2010, and was released in Europe on May 22, 2012. On 4 October 2013, the game was re-released on Steam and GOG.com and made available on OS X and Linux platforms. A remaster published by Ziggurat Interactive titled Enclave HD is set to release on Nintendo Switch, PlayStation 4, and Xbox One in Q3 2022.

In this game, set in a medieval fantasy realm, players can choose to take on the role of either a "Warrior of Light" or a "Minion of Darkness", complete with separate and unique missions reflecting the nature of that decision.

Plot 

One thousand years ago, the Dreg'Atar armies of the demon lord known as Vatar had all but destroyed the people of Celenheim. In an act of desperation, the high wizard Zale sundered the land and created a rift around Celenheim, keeping the armies of Vatar at bay. In time, Celenheim forgot the war and forgot Vatar as they went about their daily affairs. Now, the rift is closing, and evil threatens the land once again. An unlikely hero, freed from prison by happenstance, must rise and fight for Light or Darkness, to either destroy the demon king Vatar or kill the queen of Celenheim.

Gameplay 
Enclave is a third-person action role-playing game mixing puzzles, shooting, sword fights and more in a level-based structure. The player uses medieval and magical weapons to fight enemies. It also includes an optional first-person mode if the player chooses. At the beginning of each mission, the player chooses a character to control. With the character selected, the player selects weapons and gear to equip for the mission. Gold is required to equip all gear. During each mission, the player collects gold and gems to increase the starting gold available at the start of each mission.

Reception 

According to GameRankings, the game received the average score of 75.04% for the PC and 70.78% for the Xbox version.

In October 2013, Enclave was re-released on Steam and as of January 2017 has sold approximately 1.5 million copies through the Steam marketplace.

Cancelled Sequel 
In March 2003, Starbreeze announced Enclave II has been in development for Xbox, PlayStation 2, and Microsoft Wndows. The game was supposed to feature a new fighting system and full motion capture, with single player and both cooperative and competitive multiplayer modes planned. The player character was Erlendur, a young Ancestor sorcerer apprentice, and his quest was to reach Enclave before the evil sorceress Callia does. It was canceled before 1 year.  However, the features were then axed and the game was canceled when Starbreeze got into legal troubles with Swing! Entertainment.

References

External links 
 

2002 video games
Action role-playing video games
Action-adventure games
Cancelled GameCube games
Fantasy video games
Linux games
MacOS games
Role-playing video games
Starbreeze Studios games
Third-person shooters
Video games about demons
Video games featuring female protagonists
Video games developed in Sweden
Video games scored by Gustaf Grefberg
Wii games
Windows games
Xbox games
Conspiracy Entertainment games
Single-player video games
TopWare Interactive games
Swing! Entertainment games
Ziggurat Interactive games